14th parallel may refer to:

14th parallel north, a circle of latitude in the Northern Hemisphere
14th parallel south, a circle of latitude in the Southern Hemisphere